René Fluri (born 27 March 1968) is a retired Swiss football defender.

References

1968 births
Living people
Swiss men's footballers
FC Grenchen players
Neuchâtel Xamax FCS players
FC Bulle players
FC Locarno players
FC Aarau players
FC Biel-Bienne players
FC Solothurn players
Association football defenders
Swiss Super League players